The Sturtian glaciation was a worldwide glaciation during the Cryogenian Period when the Earth experienced repeated large-scale glaciations. , the Sturtian glaciation is thought to have lasted from c. 717 Ma to c. 660 Ma, a time span of approximately 57 million years. It is hypothesised to have been be a Snowball Earth event, or contrastingly multiple regional glaciations, and is the longest and most severe known glacial event preserved in the geologic record.

Etymology of name 
The Sturtian glaciation is an informal, but commonly used name for the older of two worldwide glacial events (the other is known as the Marinoan/Elatina glaciation) preserved in Cryogenian rocks. The term Sturtian was originally defined as a chronostratigraphic unit (Series) and later proposed as an international chronostratigraphic division; however, this has been superseded by international nomenclature. Ultimately, current usage of the term is in reference to the globally significant Sturt Formation (originally Sturtian Tillite) within the Adelaide Superbasin of Australia. The suggestion of the glacial nature of the Sturt Formation during the early 20th century resulted in discussion about Neoproterozoic glaciations (thought to be Cambrian at the time) and encouraged the research that eventually resulted in the Snowball Earth hypothesis. The Sturt Formation itself is named after Sturt Gorge, South Australia.

Geology 
Rocks preserving evidence for the Sturtian Glaciation are found on every continent. Notable sections are found in Australia, Canada, China, Ethiopia, Namibia, Siberia, and Svalbard.

According to Eyles and Young, "Glaciogenic rocks figure prominently in the Neoproterozoic stratigraphy of southeastern Australia and the northern Canadian Cordillera. The Sturtian glaciogenic succession (c. 740 Ma) unconformably overlies rocks of the Burra Group." The Sturtian succession includes two major diamictite-mudstone sequences which represent glacial advance and retreat cycles. It is stratigraphically correlated with the Rapitan Group of North America.

Reusch's Moraine in northern Norway may have been deposited during this period.

See also
Adelaide Rift Complex
Marinoan glaciation

References

Ice ages
Cryogenian